St. Andrew's Episcopal Church, also known as the Salvation Army Citidel Corps and now hosting the Salvation Army Corps Community Center, is a historic building located at 206 South Peabody Street, in Port Angeles, Washington.

Originally a church, the structure was built in 1905 in Gothic Revival style. Between 1905 and  1914 a free standing parish hall was constructed south of the chapel. St. Andrew's became an official parish in 1946.

References

20th-century Episcopal church buildings
Buildings and structures in Clallam County, Washington
Churches completed in 1905
Episcopal churches in Washington (state)
Churches on the National Register of Historic Places in Washington (state)
National Register of Historic Places in Clallam County, Washington
National Register of Historic Places in Port Angeles, Washington
1905 establishments in Washington (state)